Blim TV (stylized as blim tv) is an on-demand video subscription service, offered online via TelevisaUnivision, through an Internet connection, which offers access to programs strictly for personal use, in exchange for payment of a monthly subscription fee.

Its center of operations is in Mexico City. It is currently available in 18 countries: Mexico, Colombia, Argentina, Costa Rica, Panama, Chile, Peru, Venezuela, Ecuador, Guatemala, Bolivia, Honduras, Paraguay, El Salvador, Nicaragua, Uruguay, Dominican Republic and Belize.

It owns the productions of Televisa, as well the broadcast rights for titles from creators and distributors like Walt Disney Pictures, Paramount Pictures, Metro-Goldwyn-Mayer and BBC.

To compete with other on demand video services, it initially offered a monthly subscription for 109 pesos (approximately $5.65 US). Like Netflix, blim tv offers the first month of its service free of charge.

On 3 September 2019, Blim was relaunched as “blim tv”, adding 30 live television channels like Las Estrellas, Canal 5, Tlnovelas, Telemundo Internacional and Antena 3.

As of July 2021, Luis Arvizu is the CEO of the company.

Controversy 
In 2016, Televisa realized people watched Netflix more than cable television. In an attempt to re-gain their lost viewers, they decided to remove all of their original content from Netflix. They then created their own Netflix-like streaming service, called Blim. Soon after Televisa announced Blim, Mexicans began mocking them through Internet memes for producing lesser-quality original content  compared to Netflix' more critically acclaimed original content. Netflix itself released an ad which made fun of Televisa's original content. It criticized Bilm and Televisa for the perceived lesser quality of their content, as well as for removing it from Netflix. The ad featured a man acting sad because Televisa's original content was removed, with his mom looking at him strangely. Televisa retaliated by releasing an ad where a look-a-like man was happy having subscribed to Blim. However Televisa's ad did not get the response they expected. It only caused more unfavorable criticism compared to Netflix. Blim and Televisa were even more heavily criticized for not understanding Millennials, some of whom went as far as thanking Televisa for removing their content from Netflix. The main argument against Televisa was that there was no need to pay for a streaming service to see series that are available to watch on YouTube without needing to buy cable in the first place.

Original programming

References

External links 
 

Televisa
Android (operating system) software
Entertainment companies established in 2016
Internet properties established in 2016
Mass media companies established in 2016
Mexican entertainment websites
Recommender systems
Video on demand services
Video rental services
Mexican companies established in 2016